American singer Christina Aguilera has released nine studio albums, two extended plays (EPs), six compilation albums, one soundtrack album, 54 singles (including eight as featured artist), and 17 promotional singles. To date, Aguilera has sold around 90 to 100 million records worldwide, making her one of the best-selling female music artist of all time. Billboard ranked Aguilera as the 37th Greatest Hot 100 Women of All Time and the 44th Greatest Billboard 200 Women of All Time. In the United States alone, Aguilera has sold 18.3 million albums. Through the RIAA she has 16.5 million certified albums units and 10 million certified digital singles units.
 Aguilera is recognized as the 20th best-selling artist of the 2000s. She has also achieved 10 number one hits on Billboards Dance Club Songs.
In the United Kingdom, Aguilera has sold over 3.3 million albums and 6.1 million singles.

Aguilera made her musical debut in 1998 with a cover of "Reflection", the theme song for Disney's Mulan. Consequently, Aguilera signed a multi-album contract with RCA Records and released her self-titled debut album in 1999. It debuted at number one on the US Billboard 200 chart and produced the singles "Genie in a Bottle", "What a Girl Wants", "I Turn to You" and "Come On Over Baby (All I Want Is You)". The lead single, "Genie in a Bottle", became a commercial success, peaking the top spot of the US Billboard Hot 100 for five weeks and became the biggest hit of the summer of 1999. Christina Aguilera has sold over 14 million copies worldwide.

Aguilera's two next studio albums, Mi Reflejo and My Kind of Christmas, were both released in 2000. In 2001, she recorded two singles: "Nobody Wants to Be Lonely" with Ricky Martin from the latter's Sound Loaded, and "Lady Marmalade" with Mýa, Lil' Kim and Pink for Moulin Rouge! The latter was an international hit, peaking at number one on the Billboard Hot 100 for five consecutive weeks, becoming the most successful airplay-only single in history. Aguilera's fourth studio album, Stripped (2002), was intended to reflect her "real" personality. It debuted at number two on the Billboard 200 chart and spawned the successful singles "Dirrty", "Beautiful", "Fighter", "Can't Hold Us Down" and "The Voice Within". Stripped has since sold over 12 million copies worldwide.

Aguilera's fifth studio album, Back to Basics (2006), is a dual disc album and was inspired by 1930s and 1940s jazz, blues and soul. It yielded the international top-ten hits "Ain't No Other Man", "Hurt" and "Candyman". As of November 2013, Back to Basics has sold over 5 million units. Aguilera's first greatest hits album, Keeps Gettin' Better: A Decade of Hits, was released in 2008 and featured one single, "Keeps Gettin' Better". "Keeps Gettin' Better" became her biggest debut on the Billboard Hot 100, entering the chart at number seven in 2008. Aguilera's sixth and seventh studio albums, Bionic (2010) and Lotus (2012), both struggled to match the chart impact and sales of her previous albums. From 2011 to 2013, Aguilera appeared on tracks including "Moves like Jagger", "Feel This Moment" and "Say Something", all of which are top-ten hits worldwide. With "Moves like Jagger" topping the US Billboard Hot 100 in 2011, Aguilera became the fourth female artist to top the chart in three consecutive decades (1990s, 2000s, and 2010s).

From 2013 to 2015, Aguilera released a string of singles including "We Remain", "Change" and "Telepathy". After a brief hiatus, Aguilera released her eighth studio album Liberation on June 15, 2018. The album was preceded by the singles "Accelerate", "Fall in Line" and "Like I Do", and the promotional single, "Twice". The album received positive acclaim and earned two Grammy Award nominations. In 2020, she re-recorded "Reflection" for the 2020 live adaption of Mulan alongside a new song, "Loyal Brave True", which was shortlisted for an Academy Award for Best Original Song. In 2021, Aguilera announced that she was working on a follow-up Spanish album to her 2000 Mi Reflejo. She released her ninth studio album Aguilera on May 31, 2022. The album was released in three parts: La Fuerza, La Tormenta and La Luz.

Albums

Studio albums

Compilation albums

Soundtrack albums

Extended plays

Singles

As lead artist

As featured artist

Promotional singles

Other charted songs

See also
List of Christina Aguilera concerts
List of Christina Aguilera concert tours
List of songs recorded by Christina Aguilera
Christina Aguilera videography

Notes

References

Sources

External links

 Official website
 Christina Aguilera at AllMusic
 

Discography
Pop music discographies
Rhythm and blues discographies
Discographies of American artists